Nicholas Baragwanath is a British music theorist, musicologist and pianist. He is currently Professor of Music at the University of Nottingham. He is best known for his contributions to the compositional theory and practice of 19th-century Italian Opera. He regularly writes and presents for BBC Radio 3.

Education 
Baragwanath trained as a pianist at the Royal Academy of Music and, under Ryszard Bakst, at the Royal Northern College of Music. In 1998, he completed his MA and D.Phil at the University of Sussex and lectured at the University of Wellington, New Zealand. In 2001, Baragwanath moved to the Royal Northern College of Music to become Head of Postgraduate Studies and later became the Dean of Research and Enterprise. Since 2010, he has taught at the University of Nottingham.

Research on 19th century Italian Opera and 18th century pedagogy
Baragwanath's research into the Italian traditions of 19th century Opera has revised opinions as to how composition was learned by composers by offering a detailed analysis of the methods of the Italian conservatories, notably in Naples and Northern Italy. These historical Italian methods of composition, grounded in solfeggio, partimento and counterpoint, offer an alternative method of analysis of Italian Opera to the standard Austro-German tradition.

Baragwanath's latest book on the solfeggio tradition provides the first major study of the fundamentals of eighteenth-century music education. It recovers an entirely forgotten art of melody that allowed musicians to develop exceptional skills in improvisation, composition, and score-reading.

Books 
 The Italian Traditions and Puccini: Compositional Theory and Practice in Nineteenth-Century Opera (2011). Indiana University Press.
 The Solfeggio Tradition: A Forgotten Art of Melody in the Long Eighteenth Century (2020). Oxford University Press.

Awards 
 Westrup Prize (2006) - Musicology and Critical Theory: The Case of Wagner, Adorno, and Horkheimer.
 Marjorie Weston Emerson Award (2014) - Mozart’s early chamber music with keyboard: traditions of performance, composition and commodification in Mozart’s Chamber Music with Keyboard, edited by Martin Harlow (Cambridge, 2012).

See also
 Solfeggio
 Partimento

References

Bibliography

External links
 Nicholas Baragwanath Faculty page at University of Nottingham.
 
 

Music theorists
20th-century British musicologists
British music theorists
21st-century musicologists
Living people
Year of birth missing (living people)